American Water is the third studio album by indie rock group Silver Jews. Released in 1998 as an LP and CD on Drag City (DC149) in America and Domino (WIG56) in Europe, American Water was recorded at The Rare Book Room in Brooklyn and mastered at Abbey Road Studios. The album features musicians Tim Barnes, David Berman, Mike Fellows, Stephen Malkmus, Chris Stroffolino, and artwork by Chris Kysor.

Album 
Berman was struggling with drug addiction during the recording of American Water. Lyrically, this is expressed in a sense of solidarity with the downtrodden. He described the album's sessions saying "I was taking a lot of drugs at that time. And there were a lot of drugs in the studio. And all these things that would have horrified indie rock people, that I would never want them to know. I wanted to make a record that wasn't some terrible, big, painful experience. I wanted to make records like other people make records, where you're having fun when you're doing it."

American Water is a continuation from their previous album The Natural Bridge, taking on the themes, accepting them and then questioning them altogether. Berman explained this by saying "The Natural Bridge is me finding out that random rules and I can't handle it... And then in American Water I'm trying to re-say it again, to someone else, after having accepted it. And now I question later on whether things were random at all."

According to a 1998 article in online zine Addicted to Noise, the working title for this album was The Late, Great Silver Jews — a reference to the similarly titled 1972 album by Townes Van Zandt.  Among the songs recorded for the album, but omitted from the final product, were "Self-Ignition" (released as a B-side on the "Send in the Clouds" single) and "Police Conversation, 1783", which was never released.

On January 31, 2009, when Silver Jews played their last show ever inside Cumberland Caverns in McMinnville, Tennessee, the final song they performed was the album's second track, "Smith & Jones Forever".

Critical reception

Accolades

Track listing

Personnel
The American Water Band
 David Berman - lead vocals, guitar
 Stephen Malkmus - guitar, backing vocals, co-lead vocals on "Federal Dust" and "Blue Arrangements"
 Mike Fellows - bass
 Tim Barnes - drums, percussion
 Chris Stroffolino - trumpet on "Random Rules", keyboards on "Random Rules", "We Are Real", "  the Death", and "The Wild Kindness", piano on "Send in the Clouds" and "Buckingham Rabbit"

Additional Personnel
 Chris Kysor - cover art
 Nicolas Vernhes - production

References

1998 albums
Domino Recording Company albums
Drag City (record label) albums
Silver Jews albums